The Maldonada redbelly toad (Melanophryniscus moreirae)  is a species of toad in the family Bufonidae.
It is endemic to Brazil.
Its natural habitats are subtropical or tropical high-altitude grassland, swamps, and intermittent freshwater marshes.

References

Melanophryniscus
Amphibians of Brazil
Endemic fauna of Brazil
Amphibians described in 1920
Taxa named by Alípio de Miranda-Ribeiro
Taxonomy articles created by Polbot